Hole in the Wall is a 2016 South African Afrikaans-language independent drama film directed and produced by André Odendaal and Johan Vorster from a screenplay by Susan Coetzer. After a limited release in 2016, the film was distributed worldwide by Netflix in 2020. The film won the 2021 South African Film and Television Award for Best Actress in a feature film (for Tinarie van Wyk-Loots), from three nominations, all for acting.

Cast 
Andre Odendaal as Rian
Tinarie van Wyk-Loots as Ava
Nicholas Campbell as Ben
Bheki Mkhwane as Toni

References

External links 

2016 films
2016 drama films
2016 independent films
South African drama films
South African independent films
Afrikaans-language films